The Shanghai Masters is a professional snooker tournament. Originally a ranking event, it became a non-ranking invitation event in 2018. Ronnie O'Sullivan is the reigning champion. Ronnie O'Sullivan won the 2018 title, the first time it has been defended.

History 
The event was introduced in the 2007/2008 season and was the second ranking event to be held in China as a result of the growth of the sport in the country. Until 2016, an extra wildcard round was included before the first round proper, featuring eight players. In 2018 the tournament became a 24-man invitation event.

Winners

Records

Statistics 
Highest ranked champion: Ronnie O'Sullivan (2009) - #1
Lowest ranked champion: Kyren Wilson (2015) - #54
Highest break: 147
 Jamie Cope (2008)
 John Higgins (2012)
 Stephen Maguire (2016)

Finalists

Champions by country

References

 
Recurring sporting events established in 2007
2007 establishments in China
Sports competitions in Shanghai
Snooker ranking tournaments
Snooker competitions in China